Talkhiyaan (English: Bitterness) is a 2013 Pakistani drama serial, written by Bee Gul and directed by Khalid Ahmed. It highlights a stereotypical mentality of men that live by their ancestral pride and deep-rooted notions of a caste system. It depicts the frustrations of a mother, wife and daughter who are provoked by society.

The serial features Sanam Saeed and Australian actor, writer and film director Summer Nicks and Mehak Khan in lead roles.

It is based on The God of Small Things , a semi-autobiographical novel by Indian author Arundhati Roy. The novel won Booker Prize in 1997. The story line in the series is same as that of the novel although the names of the characters are changed (Ammu is Bibi, Rahel is Zoya, Estha is Jugnoo etc.) The series was aired on Zindagi (TV channel) under the title Kisi Ki Khatir from 30 June 2015.

Plot 
After her divorce from Paul, Bibi returns to her paternal house, Silver Wood with her children Zoya and Jugnu. The residents of Silver Wood, Agha Ji, Mama, Appu Ji and Aayi shocked to know about her divorce. Everyone there criticise Bibi and taunt her as according to them she has ruined the her and her parent's race by marrying the English.

In the meantime, Janu Baba also returns to the Silver Wood from abroad after divorcing his English wife and is welcomed whole heartedly by everyone except Bibi. Janu Baba then supervises the Mama Ji's business of Jams and Pickles and covert this house industry to a factory. Agha Ji who abuses physically Mama one day gets threatened by Janu Baba that if he ever beat Mama then he will beat him. After that, Agha Ji never called Mama Ji and committed suicide one day.

Cast

 Sanam Saeed as Bibi (Ammu in Novel)
 Hina Khawaja Bayat as Appu Ji (Baby Kochamma in Novel)
 Shamim Hilaly as Mama (Mammachi in Novel)
 Khalid Ahmed as Baba (Pappachi in Novel)
 Hassan Niazi as Baloo (Velutha in Novel)
 Valerie Khan as Margaret (Margaret Kochamma in  Novel)
 Chiara Maria as Lizzie (Sophie Mol in Novel)
 Haider Ali Khan as Jugnoo (Young - Estha) 
 Mehr Sagar as Jugnoo (Child - Estha) 
 Mehak Khan as Zoya (Young - Rahel) 
 Sabeena Jabeen as Zoya (Child - Rahel)
 Adnan Jaffar as Janu Baba (Chacko in Novel)
 Sarmad Mirza as Monty 
 Summer Nicks as Paul 
 Nargis Rasheed as Aai (Kochu Maria in Novel)

Awards and nominations

References

External links
 

2012 Pakistani television series debuts
Urdu-language telenovelas
Pakistani telenovelas
Zee Zindagi original programming
Television shows based on Indian novels